The 1995 ATP Championship Series, Single Week was a series of tennis tournaments that was part of the 1995 ATP Tour, the elite tour for professional men's tennis organised by the Association of Tennis Professionals. It formed the tier below the Grand Slam tournaments.

Tournaments 

Note: Although the Monte Carlo Masters is billed as taking place in Monte Carlo, it is held in Roquebrune-Cap-Martin, a commune of France adjacent to Monaco.

Results

Titles by player

Singles

See also 
 ATP Tour Masters 1000
 1995 ATP Tour
 1995 WTA Tier I Series
 1995 WTA Tour

External links 
 Association of Tennis Professionals (ATP) official website

Atp Super 9, 1995
ATP Tour Masters 1000